Robert Bostock (22 April 1784, in Bootle – 1847 in Hobart)  was an English merchant sailor. Who along with John McQueen, were accused of co-owning a Slave Factory (trading post) on the Saint Paul River, nowadays in Liberia.

Robert started his life as a merchant sailor. On 22/7/1813 he was convicted at the Special Sessions Court in Freetown , Sierra Leone with trading in slaves, shortly after the English Parliament had legislated to abolish the trade. He was sentenced to 14 years transportation to Australia, though it later transpired that he was not in Sierra Leone at the time, and that the charge was not valid. He travelled on the 'Indefatigable' and was landed in Sydney on 25/4/1815, and set about securing a pardon, which he won on 31/1/1816.

After his pardon Robert set out to expand. He had investments and business in Sydney town, and retained his associations with merchants and ship's captains. In 1816 he married Rachael Walker and they lived in some style, in Hunter Street in the centre of Sydney, where trade in all manner of goods was conducted. Then, in 1817, with their firstborn child Elizabeth, they returned to Bootle, Lancashire, but in 1821 they were travelling again, this time to Hobart in Tasmania on the vessel 'Jessie', which arrived 26/2/1821'.

On arrival in Hobart, Robert was put in charge of Government Commissariat Stores, and he continued there until completion of his own bond store in 1822. This two storey store was later obtained by the government and used for 'Treasury' until about 1890, when it was demolished. Robert also went into ship-building for a period, building a sloop/cutter called "Governor Arthur", which was launched from Newtown, Tasmania in November 1824. This was a 1 masted vessel of 42 tons.

By 1825, with his family, he had moved to Epping Forest, in Tasmania, where he lived in a stone house by the South Esk River, and where he built a weir to back up the flow of the river for 2 miles, in 'Vaucluse'. He was very active building up his cattle and grazing lands, continually applying for further acreage to be developed. The name 'Vaucluse' derives from 'Valla Clausa' which means 'secluded valley'. The house was completed in 1830.

Robert continued to acquire and develop property in the region, owning 4500 acres in 1836, and 8000 acres by his death in 1847. He was also granted permission to build an inn on one of these properties.

The Launceston Examiner of 19/6/1847 wrote of his funeral "The funeral took place at Campbell Town of the late Mr. Bostock. The procession was attended by numbers of his friends and acquaintances amongst whom he was highly respected. His kindness of heart and unbounded hospitality had also secured for him very generous respect. Mr. Bostock was one of the oldest settlers in Van Dieman's Land."

His house in 'Vaucluse' remains a beautiful house, maintained by its current owners in a beautiful setting. It is listed by the Historic Houses Trust of New South Wales.

References

Further reading

1784 births
1847 deaths
English slave traders
19th-century English businesspeople
British people in colonial Australia